Edmund de la Pole may refer to: 

Edmund de la Pole (Captain of Calais) (c. 1337–1414)
Edmund de la Pole, 3rd Duke of Suffolk (1471/1472–1513)